Muellerella is a genus of lichenicolous lichens in the family Verrucariaceae. The genus has a widespread distribution, especially in northern temperate areas, and contains species that live on other lichens, or on liverworts.

Molecular phylogenetic analysis published in 2019 indicates that the genus, as currently circumscribed, is polyphyletic. M. atricola and M. lichenicola form one monophyletic lineage in the genus, but the rest of the species tested fell into two distinct monophyletic lineages. The authors suggest the placement of the genus within the subclass Chaetothyriomycetidae, but acknowledge that more genetic analysis is required to determine the correct placement of the type species, Muellerella polyspora.

Species
Muellerella antarctica 
Muellerella erratica 
Muellerella frullaniae 
Muellerella hospitans 
Muellerella lecanactidis 
Muellerella lichenicola 
Muellerella polyspora 
Muellerella pygmaea 
Muellerella rubescens 
Muellerella stictinae 
Muellerella thalamita 
Muellerella ventosicola 
Muellerella vesicularia

References

Verrucariales
Eurotiomycetes genera
Lichenicolous fungi
Lichen genera
Taxa described in 1862
Taxa named by Johannes Müller Argoviensis